Theodore Carl Wills (born February 9, 1934 in Fresno, California) is an American former professional baseball pitcher. He played all or part of five seasons in Major League Baseball for the Boston Red Sox, Cincinnati Reds and Chicago White Sox between 1959 and 1965.

Professional career
Wills attended Fresno State University. The Red Sox signed Wills in 1955 to his first professional contract. After a four full years in the minors, he made his big league debut on May 24, 1959. Over parts of four seasons with the Bosox, he appeared in 42 games pitched, won six, lost nine and posted a 6.09 earned run average. He recorded two complete games as a starting pitcher; both occurred during his rookie  campaign.

On May 8, 1962, the Reds purchased Wills from the Red Sox. After spending the 1963–64 seasons in the minor leagues with the San Diego Padres, the White Sox acquired Wills from the Reds before the 1965 season. He was let go in June, and pitched in the Cleveland Indians and St. Louis Cardinals organizations before the end of the season, his last as a professional.

Overview 
Throughout his career, Wills was used mostly as a reliever, appearing in 83 total games, starting 13, and working in 186 innings pitched. He allowed 210 hits and 97 bases on balls, with 133 strikeouts. He was more successful as a reliever, compiling a 6–4 career record as a reliever, with five saves and a 5.17 ERA.

Overall, he went 8–11 with a 5.46 ERA with perhaps his best season being his last-in 1965, he appeared in 15 games and had an ERA of 2.84. At the plate, Wills was a solid batter—in 44 career at-bats, he hit .250 with three career doubles. Fielding was not his best asset—he had a .911 career fielding percentage, committing four career errors. Wills played his final game on June 12, 1965.

Personal life
Wills currently resides in Clovis, California. Ted's father, Ted C. Wills, Sr., was mayor of Fresno from 1969 to 1977.

References

https://www.latimes.com/archives/la-xpm-2003-nov-10-me-passings10.2-story.html

External links

1934 births
Living people
Albany Senators players
Baseball players from California
Boston Red Sox players
Chattanooga Lookouts players
Chicago White Sox players
Cincinnati Reds players
Fresno State Bulldogs baseball players
Greensboro Patriots players
Jacksonville Suns players
Major League Baseball pitchers
Minneapolis Millers (baseball) players
Oklahoma City 89ers players
Portland Beavers players
San Diego Padres (minor league) players
San Jose Red Sox players
Seattle Rainiers players
Sportspeople from Fresno, California